Lionel Bonnel (born September 26, 1966) is a French ski mountaineer and skiing instructor.

Bonnel, member of the Club Alpin Français, holds the Chamonix-Zermatt Haute Route record with Stéphane Brosse, in 21h11'  He is married with three children, and lives in Saint-Jean-de-Maurienne.

Selected results 
 2006:
 9th (and 4th in "Seniors I" class ranking), Patrouille des Glaciers (together with Alain Premat and Sébastien Baud)
 2007:
 7th, Trofeo Mezzalama (together with Fabien Anselmet and Sébastien Baud)

Pierra Menta 

 1993: 10th, together with Patrick Lambert
 1994: 6th, together with Patrick Lambert
 1997: 8th, together with Patrick Lambert
 1998: 10th, together with Michel Sibuet Becquet
 2005: 10th, together with Daniel Degabai

References

French male ski mountaineers
1966 births
Living people